An Essay on Abstinence from Animal Food, as a Moral Duty is a book on ethical vegetarianism and animal rights written by Joseph Ritson, first published in 1802.

Description

Ritson became a vegetarian in 1772 at the age of 19. He was influenced by Bernard Mandeville's The Fable of the Bees and adopted a milk and vegetable diet. Ritson stated that for thirty years he had never tasted fish, flesh or fowl but he did eat eggs because it deprives no animal of life. He campaigned for the welfare of animals and the ethical necessity of a vegetarian diet.

Ritson spent years collecting information for the book. He argued that animal food is cruel, unnecessary and the result of provocative cannibalism. Ritson believed that man's only chance of happiness is to develop higher moral virtues of benevolence, justice and humanity by adopting a vegetarian diet. The book argues on physiological grounds that an animal diet is not natural for mankind and is a cause of disease and suffering.

The book was declined by many publishers. It was published by Sir Richard Phillips a vegetarian, in 1802. It is one of the first works to argue for vegetarianism from an ethical basis. Thomas Tryon and George Cheyne had authored books advocating a vegetarian diet but Ritson was the one who made vegetarianism a moral imperative. Ritson argued that meat-eating had a negative effect on the human character as it made people aggressive. Ritson criticized English blood sports of his day which he associated with the degeneracy of meat-eating:

Ritson was an atheist and did not utilize religious arguments for vegetarianism. Ritson rejected creationism and similar to James Burnett, Lord Monboddo believed that men were related to monkeys. He tried to eliminate the boundaries that distinguish humans from animals by arguing that humans are similar to vegetarian animals and language was no more natural for man than for monkeys or parrots.

Reception

Influence

Ritson's book influenced the vegetarian movement. Many of his arguments such as one does not need meat to survive, animal food is not necessary for strength and a vegetarian diet promotes health would later be utilized in vegetarian publications.

Ritson's book heavily influenced Percy Bysshe Shelley who utilized many of his vegetarian arguments. In 1939, Historian David Lee Clark compared paragraphs from Ritson's book to Shelley's A Vindication of Natural Diet (1813) and noted that in addition to general similarities "there are many parallels in phrasal patterns which could hardly be accidental."

Criticism

Historian of vegetarianism Colin Spencer commented that Ritson's ideas about abstinence from meat-eating were not popular with the majority of people during his time, who considered his views dangerous.

Henry Brougham and Sydney Smith criticized the book in a lengthy review in The Edinburgh Review, in 1803. They took issue with the inconsistences of Ritson's moral vegetarianism. For example, they noted that although Ritson abstained from meat he consumed milk and eggs, "Is not the consumption of milk the starving of calves? and is not the devouring of eggs, the causing of acute misery to a tender mother, and the procuring of abortions?". They stated that whilst writing the vegetarian arguments for his book, Ritson had used a quill plucked from a goose, ink made from insects and a whale-tallow candle.

A reviewer in The Monthly Review in 1803 also noted inconsistences with Ritson's vegetarian arguments, such as his consumption of milk. "Milk, too, which Mr. Ritson so strongly recommends as food, is an animal production; and it cannot be procured in sufficient quantities for the use of man, without prodigious injustice to the author's clients, the sucking calves, asses and goats." Negative reviews also appeared the same year in The British Critic and The Critical Review.

In 1896, the Dictionary of National Biography suggested that the work "bears marks of incipient insanity". Biographer Bertrand Harris Bronson commented that much of the content from Ritson's book was dubious:

Carol J. Adams has rejected the suggestions of Ritson's 19th century critics that the book was a sign of insanity. Adams noted that Ritson's last work Life of King Arthur from Ancient Historians and Authentic Documents, published posthumously in 1825 was widely reviewed as an early example of modern scholarship. Adams questioned "If Ritson's final work reveals a mature scholar, how can his penultimate work be a sign of his insanity? Because it is being judged by the texts of meat which dismember vegetarian words."

See also

Fruits and Farinacea
Reasons for not Eating Animal Food

References

External links
An Essay on Abstinence from Animal Food, as a Moral Duty

1802 non-fiction books
Books about animal rights
Books about vegetarianism
Books by Joseph Ritson
English non-fiction books